Norasaphus monroeae is a species of asaphid trilobites named after Marilyn Monroe for its hourglass-like shaped glabellum.  Its fossils are found in Arenig-aged marine strata from the Nora Formation, in the Georgina Basin, situated between the Northern Territory and Queensland, Australia.

See also
List of organisms named after famous people (born 1900–1949)

References

Asaphidae
Fossil taxa described in 1948
Marilyn Monroe